Cristián Araya (born 15 September 1969) is a Chilean former professional tennis player.

While competing on the professional tour, Araya reached career high rankings of 315 for singles and 220 for doubles. He was a doubles semi-finalist at the 1988 Buenos Aires Grand Prix and the following year was doubles champion at a Challenger tournament in Santos. His career included three Davis Cup doubles appearances for Chile, one partnering Ricardo Acuña in 1988 and the other two with Pedro Rebolledo in 1990.

Araya is now a tennis coach based in France.

ATP Challenger titles

Doubles: (1)

See also
List of Chile Davis Cup team representatives

References

External links
 
 
 

1969 births
Living people
Chilean male tennis players